Alison Ada Harris (born 23 July 1965) is a Scottish Conservative Party politician, who served as a Member of the Scottish Parliament (MSP) for Central Scotland from 2016 to 2021.

Political career

Westminster elections 
Harris stood unsuccessfully in the 2015 United Kingdom general election for the Westminster constituency, Falkirk. She came third out of the five candidates with 7,325 votes increasing the vote share to 12.13%

Scottish Parliament 
For the 2016 Scottish Parliament election, Harris was selected to contest the Falkirk West constituency and was placed third on the Conservatives' Central region list, behind Margaret Mitchell MSP and Graham Simpson MSP. Margaret Mitchell was re-elected and both Simpson and Harris were elected to the Scottish Parliament for the first time on the Central region list.

Harris was the Scottish Conservative spokesperson for taxation and financial sustainability. She was deputy convener of the Public Audit Committee.

References

External links 
 

1965 births
Living people
Place of birth missing (living people)
Scottish accountants
Conservative MSPs
Members of the Scottish Parliament 2016–2021
Female members of the Scottish Parliament